The 2001 Boston Marathon was the 105th running of the annual marathon race in Boston, United States and was held on April 16. The elite men's race was won by South Korea's Lee Bong-ju in a time of 2:09:43 hours and the women's race was won by Kenya's Catherine Ndereba in 2:23:53.

A total of 13,395 people finished the race, 8586 men and 4809 women.

Results

Men

Women

References

Results. Association of Road Racing Statisticians. Retrieved 2020-04-13.

External links
 Boston Athletic Association website

Boston Marathon
Boston
Boston Marathon
Marathon
Boston Marathon